Meat Atlas is an annual report, published by the Heinrich Böll Foundation and Friends of the Earth Europe, on the methods and impact of industrial animal agriculture and the meat industry. Barbara Unmuessig, the foundation's president, said that the report's goal is to inform consumers about the consequences of increasingly industrialized  meat production.

Synopsis

Overview

Over  of meat is consumed in the United States per person per year, 60 kg in Germany, 38 kg in China, and under 20 kg in Africa.

Pigs can reach their market weight with 10–15 percent less food if they are kept on antibiotics, but overuse increases the likelihood of antibiotic-resistant bacteria, so-called "superbugs."

See also
Beef hormone controversy

References

Further reading

 Meat Atlas, Friends of the Earth, download Meat Atlas as pdf; download summary and policy demands as pdf
 Meat Atlas, Heinrich Böll Foundation
 Alexandra Endres, "Fleischatlas – Unser täglich Hormonfleisch", Die Zeit, 9 January 2014.
Shefali Sharma, "Germans speaking out against industrial meat and agriculture", Institute for Agriculture and Trade Policy, 9 January 2014.
"Fleischatlas 2014: Trog, Teller und Sonntagsbraten", Frankfurter Allgemeine Zeitung, 9 January 2014.
"Fleischatlas 2014: Pro und Contra Fleisch als Lebensmittel", WDR 5, 9 January 2014.
"Alarm over soaring world meat consumption", Deutsche Welle, 9 January 2014.

Agriculture books
Environmental reports
Meat industry
2014 non-fiction books
Creative Commons-licensed works
Vegetarianism in Germany